Intent to Kill may refer to:
 Intent to Kill (1958 film), a British film noir thriller
 Intent to Kill (1992 film), an action, independent and thriller film
 Voluntary manslaughter, a legal term